The Robert M. Hogue House is a historic mansion located in the Mount Airy neighborhood of Philadelphia, Pennsylvania. It was built in 1896, and is a -story, rectangular stone dwelling in the Jacobean revival-style. It features two-story projecting bays with leaded glass windows, soaring cross gables and dormers, and pointed arch openings. Also on the property is a contributing stable / carriage house and a free standing stone fireplace. It housed the Philadelphia School of Criminology from the late-1940s to 1963, then housed Combs School of Music until 1983.

It was added to the National Register of Historic Places on January 16, 1986.

References

Houses on the National Register of Historic Places in Philadelphia
Jacobean architecture in Pennsylvania
Houses completed in 1896
Mount Airy, Philadelphia